James Alexander Mackay QPM retired as Deputy Chief Constable of Tayside Police in 2001. He has had considerable experience of criminal investigation and major inquiries. He is especially interested in forensic science and has served on national committees particularly in the field of DNA in police investigation.

SCRO report
In June 2000, James Mackay was appointed by the Crown Office to investigate an accusation made in 1997 by four fingerprint experts from the Scottish Criminal Record Office (SCRO) against PC Shirley McKie leading to her arrest in 1998 on a charge of perjury. At McKie's trial in 1999, the SCRO fingerprint evidence was rejected and she was acquitted.

Mackay's interim report on the matter was submitted to the Crown Office on 3 August 2000 and on its strength the four SCRO fingerprint experts were suspended and Scottish ministers were informed. In October 2000, Mackay submitted his final report, which concluded that SCRO had made a mistake yet had not owned up to it. However, the Crown Office decided to take no action against the four fingerprint personnel, who had been reinstated in the SCRO.

SCCRC
James Mackay was one of eight Board Members of the Scottish Criminal Cases Review Commission (SCCRC), which conducted a four-year review of the conviction of Abdelbaset al-Megrahi in the Pan Am Flight 103 bombing trial. The Commission completed its review on 28 June 2007 by referring Megrahi's to the High Court of Justiciary for his second appeal against conviction for the Lockerbie bombing.

References

External links
Report by Mackay into the McKie case

Scottish police officers
Tayside Police officers
British police chief officers
Living people
Scottish recipients of the Queen's Police Medal
Year of birth missing (living people)